Payoneer Global Inc. is an American financial services company that provides online money transfer, digital payment services and provides customers with working capital.

History
Payoneer was founded in 2005 with $2 million in seed funding from founder and then-CEO Yuval Tal and other private investors. 83North (Greylock Israel) led an additional $4 million in funding in 2007, with additional investors including Carmel Ventures, Crossbar Capital, Ping An, Wellington Management, Susquehanna Growth Equity, Naftali Bennett and Nyca Partners. Since 2005 Payoneer has raised over $265 million from investors.

In March 2016, the firm acquired internet escrow company Armor Payments. aiming to address the market for B2B transactions between US$500 and $1,000,000 where credit cards and letters of credit are not suitable. It also began working with the Latin American eCommerce site Linio.

In August 2016, the firm added an automated tax form service to its mass payout offering.

In October 2016, the company raised $180 million from Technology Crossover Ventures, bringing the total funding to $234 million.

In 2017, China Broadband Capital (CBC) invested in Payoneer.

In 2017 and 2018, Payoneer was named as CNBC's 40th and 13th most disruptive companies, respectively.

In 2018, former chief economist of Israel, Yoel Naveh, joined the company to lead Payoneer's working capital division.

Payoneer expanded its Capital Advance service in mid-2019, specifically for e-commerce sellers in the United States, which allows merchants selling on internet platforms such as Amazon and Walmart immediate access to working capital.

In 2019, Payoneer partnered with freelancing platform Toptal to facilitate cross-border payments, allowing more efficient movement of wages between employer and its remote workers. Payoneer also got an authorisation as an Electronic Money Institution by Central Bank of Ireland for customers in EEU.

In 2019, Payoneer hired FT Partners to help facilitate expansion of the company and an additional round of private funding.

In December 2019, Payoneer acquired optile, a German payments orchestration platform. The acquisition allows Payoneer, for the first time, to offer merchant services and consumer payment acceptance in addition to the B2B services they have been providing since inception. Daniel Smeds founded and runs optile, and its staff of 75, which will continue to operate as an independent group based out of their current HQ in Munich while also working for Payoneer.

In February 2020, the company was included in the Forbes Fintech 50: The Most Innovative Fintech Companies in 2020.

Since 6 January 2021, Wirecard EUR receiving accounts on Payoneer can only receive payments from approved payment sources. Wirecard AG is insolvent since 25 June 2020 but the EUR receiving account is supported by their subsidiary Wirecard Bank AG, which is not part of the insolvency proceedings. Users have the ability to receive payments from other sources by requesting a Citibank EUR receiving account.

In February 2021, Payoneer announced that it will become a publicly traded company through a merger with FTAC Olympus Acquisition Corp. (NASDAQ: FTOCU), a Special Purpose Acquisition Company (SPAC) owned by former Bancorp CEO Betsy Z. Cohen. The combined company will operate as Payoneer and have an implied estimated enterprise value of approximately $3.3 billion at closing, with $300 million coming from private investment in public equity (PIPE) from investors including Dragoneer Investment Group, Fidelity Management & Research, and Franklin Templeton.

The company went public on the NASDAQ stock exchange on 28 June 2021.

In May 2022, the company began to offer Payoneer Checkout, a service which enables merchants to work with direct-to-customer (DTC) online stores.

Services 
Account holders can send and receive funds using an e-wallet, a virtual bank account number in a local currency or a re-loadable prepaid MasterCard debit card. Money received can then be withdrawn to a bank account or used online / at points of sale with the Payoneer debit card. The company specializes in facilitating cross-border B2B payments. It provides cross-border transactions in 200 countries and territories and more than 150 local currencies, with its cross border wire transfers, online payments, and refillable debit card services.

Companies like Airbnb, Amazon, Google and Upwork use Payoneer to send mass payouts around the world. It is also used by eCommerce marketplaces such as Rakuten, Walmart and Wish.com, freelance marketplaces such as Fiverr and Envato, and works with ad networks to connect these firms with publishers based outside of their headquartered country.

In the content creation space, Payoneer works with Getty Images, iStock, Pond5, and others as well as in the freelance marketplace.

, Payoneer has a customer care team with 320 employees who support 4 million customers in 70 languages, operating in 150 different currencies.

In October 2019, the company launched a service aimed for small and medium-sized businesses to send payments anywhere in the world quickly and cheaply.

Business 
The company is headquartered in New York City. As of 2019, the company employed approximately 1,200 people, and served over 4 million customers in 14 offices around the world. In 2019 the company was valued at over $1 billion.

In order to lawfully remit money within the European Single Market, Payoneer was registered with the Gibraltar Financial Services Commission until Brexit, when it moved to Ireland.

Global reach

Philippines 
In 2009, Payoneer became available for use in the Philippines and later opened offices in Manila in 2016. Since 2015, sales volume has grown for Payoneer by 907% in the Philippines.

Japan 
The company opened offices in Japan in 2016. It partnered with the Japanese-based e-commerce giant Rakuten in a deal aimed at opening up their US site, Rakuten.com, to vendors outside the USA.

Korea 
Payoneer partnered with the Korean online B2B marketplace EC21. In 2017, the company released an Integrated Payments API for SaaS providers to link cross-border B2B payments across cloud platforms. In 2018 the company opened and office in Seoul.

Britain/EU 
In June 2017, the company opened an office in London. To protect EAA customers from Brexit-related effects, Payoneer opened a new office in Dublin in May 2020.

Pakistan 
Payoneer operates in Pakistan with MCB Bank, Standard Chartered, and Faysal Bank, among others.

In Pakistan, Paypal isn’t available, so Payoneer offers a feasible alternative and is used by people who need to transfer funds internationally or by international companies based abroad. The majority of Payoneer users are freelancers due to Pakistan’s large number of freelance service providers. Right now, Payoneer is offering a cash-receiving facility from websites like Upwork, Freelancer, Fiverr, Elance, Guru, Amazon, etc. It is also possible to buy things online with Payoneer.

China 
Payoneer has a presence in China, and in 2017, it was the exclusive partner and payment service provider of Chinese e-sellers for the Latvian e-commerce platform Joom.

Ukraine 
The company partners with several banks in Ukraine: PrivatBank; Alfa-Bank; and monobank.

India 
The firm closed its services in the Indian market in 2011 due to certain directives enforced by the Reserve Bank of India (RBI). Payoneer re-entered the Indian market in 2016, after partnering with IndusInd Bank and receiving Central Bank's approval. The company customized its offerings for the Indian market, with special reporting systems and fund-transfer limits that comply with local rules. Payoneer was the first digital payment platform in India to provide customers with a Foreign Inward Remittance Certificate (FIRC) digitally, thereby simplifying the required business processes.

French Airbnb 
Payoneer partnered with popular rental website Airbnb in November 2013. The arrangement allowed hosts to conveniently withdraw their earnings using their prepaid Payoneer debit cards. In December 2017, French authorities investigated the payment system, which allowed hosts to receive their payments directly without having to first be deposited in their bank accounts, which could lead to the possibility of tax avoidance. Airbnb agreed to withdraw the payment system in France.

Research
Payoneer publishes reports on the global economy.
 Global Seller Index (2020)
 E-Learning in the Wake of a Pandemic (2020)
 The State of Global Live Streaming in 2020
 The State of Freelancing During COVID-19 pandemic
 Global Gig Economy Index (2019)
 Global Seller Index (2019)
 Annual freelancer report (2015, 2018, 2020)
 Freelancing in 2020: An Abundance of Opportunities

Violations 
Between 2013–2018 Payoneer was involved in illegal transactions by evading OFAC sanctions and agreed to pay US$1.4 million to settle violations.

References

External links

Payment service providers
Online financial services companies of the United States
Online payments
Credit cards
Companies based in New York City
Financial services companies established in 2005
American companies established in 2005
Special-purpose acquisition companies
Companies listed on the Nasdaq